Kiwaia caerulea is a moth in the family Gelechiidae. It was described by George Hudson in 1925. It is found in New Zealand.

Taxonomy 
This species was first described by George Hudson in 1925 and named Gelechia caerulea. However in 1928 Hudson, in his seminal work The butterflies and moths of New Zealand, discussed and illustrated this species and spelling the specific epithet caerulaea. This species was placed in the genus Kiwaia in 1988 and in that publication the epithet caerulea was used. However in the 1988 catalogue of New Zealand Lepidoptera the epithet used was caerulaea. This spelling continues to be used by New Zealand publications and databases such as the New Zealand Inventory of Biodiversity and the New Zealand Organisms Register as well as organisations such as Te Papa, Auckland War Memorial Museum, the New Zealand Organisms Register and the New Zealand Arthropod collection.

References

Kiwaia
Moths described in 1925
Endemic fauna of New Zealand
Taxa named by George Hudson
Moths of New Zealand
Endemic moths of New Zealand